The 1980 Alabama Crimson Tide football team (variously "Alabama", "UA" or "Bama") represented the University of Alabama in the 1980 NCAA Division I-A football season. It was the Crimson Tide's 86th overall and 47th season as a member of the Southeastern Conference (SEC). The team was led by head coach Bear Bryant, in his 23rd year, and played their home games at Bryant–Denny Stadium in Tuscaloosa and Legion Field in Birmingham, Alabama. They finished season with ten wins and two losses (10–2 overall, 5–1 in the SEC) and with a victory over Baylor in the Cotton Bowl.

A 6–3 loss to Mississippi State ended Alabama's school record 28-game winning streak and all-time SEC record 27-game conference winning streak, and was Alabama's first loss to Mississippi State since 1957. It also cost the Tide a share of the SEC championship, the first time since 1976 they failed to win the SEC. Despite surrendering 35 points to Ole Miss, the Alabama defense still allowed only 98 points for the entire season.

Schedule

Roster

Notes

References
General

 
 

Specific

Alabama
Alabama Crimson Tide football seasons
Cotton Bowl Classic champion seasons
Alabama Crimson Tide footbal